Jan Gerrit Fitschen (born 2 May 1977 in Nordhorn) is a German long-distance runner, competing for TV Wattenscheid 01.

At the 1999 Under 23 European Championships he finished fifth over the 5000 metres. He was German champion over 5000 metres in 2001, 2002, 2005 and 2006 and over 10,000 m in 2005 and 2006.

Fitschen won the title of European Champion over 10,000 metres at the 2006 European Championships in Athletics in Gothenburg in a personal best at the time of 28:10.94. However, on May 4, 2008 in Palo Alto, California, he improved on his 10,000 m time with a personal best of 28:02.55.

References

External links 

 Fitschen keeps going in his dream race(EAA)

1977 births
Living people
People from Nordhorn
German male long-distance runners
German national athletics champions
European Athletics Championships medalists
Universiade medalists in athletics (track and field)
Universiade silver medalists for Germany
Medalists at the 2003 Summer Universiade
Sportspeople from Lower Saxony